The Howell Township Public Schools is a community public school district that serves students in pre-kindergarten through eighth grade from Howell Township, in Monmouth County, New Jersey, United States.

As of the 2020–21 school year, the district, comprised of 12 schools, had an enrollment of 5,409 students and 494.5 classroom teachers (on an FTE basis), for a student–teacher ratio of 10.9:1.

The district is classified by the New Jersey Department of Education as being in District Factor Group "FG", the fourth-highest of eight groupings. District Factor Groups organize districts statewide to allow comparison by common socioeconomic characteristics of the local districts. From lowest socioeconomic status to highest, the categories are A, B, CD, DE, FG, GH, I and J.

Students in public school for ninth through twelfth grades attend either Howell High School, Freehold Township High School or Colts Neck High School (depending on home address), as part of the Freehold Regional High School District. The Freehold Regional High School District also serves students from Colts Neck Township, Englishtown, Farmingdale, Freehold Borough, Freehold Township, Manalapan Township and Marlboro.

Schools
Schools in the district (with 2020–21 enrollment data from the National Center for Education Statistics) are five K-2 elementary schools, five 3-5 elementary schools and two middle schools for grades 6-8.

Elementary schools
Adelphia Elementary School (345 students; in grades K-2)
Danielle Palazzolo, Principal
Aldrich Elementary School (378; 3-5)
Drew Smith, Principal
Ardena Elementary School (324; 3-5)
Kathleen Mignoli, Principal
Greenville Elementary School (318; K-2)
Lynn Coco, Principal
Griebling Elementary School (255; K-2)
Betty Ferrigno, Principal
Land O' Pines Elementary School (486; PreK-2)
Dheranie Suarez, Principal
Memorial Elementary Elementary School (258; 3-5) 
Raymond Gredder, Principal
Newbury Elementary School (372; 3-5)
Jim Quinn, Principal
Ramtown Elementary School (325; 3-5)
AJ Bohrer, Principal
Taunton Elementary School (362; K-2)
Brooke Napoli, Principal

Middle schools
Howell Township Middle School North (1,116; 6-8)
Paul Farley, Principal
Howell Township Middle School South (868; 6-8)
Robert Henig, Principal

Administration
Core members of the district's administration are:
Joseph Isola, Superintendent
Ronald Sanasac, Business Administrator / Board Secretary

Board of education
The district's board of education, comprised of nine members, sets policy and oversees the fiscal and educational operation of the district through its administration. As a Type II school district, the board's trustees are elected directly by voters to serve three-year terms of office on a staggered basis, with three seats up for election each year held (since 2012) as part of the November general election. The board appoints a superintendent to oversee the district's day-to-day operations and a business administrator to supervise the business functions of the district.

References

External links
Howell Township Public Schools
 
School Data for the Howell Township Public Schools, National Center for Education Statistics
Howell High School
Colts Neck High School
Freehold Regional High School District

Howell Township, New Jersey
New Jersey District Factor Group FG
School districts in Monmouth County, New Jersey